Grand Bahama Stadium is a stadium in the city of Freeport in the Bahamas. The stadium, mostly used for football and athletics.This is the principal stadium on the island of Grand Bahama.

Grand Bahama Stadium, in its normal configuration, has room for 3,100 spectators.

References

Football venues in the Bahamas
Athletics (track and field) venues in the Bahamas